Creixomil may refer to the following parishes in Portugal:

 Creixomil (Barcelos), in the municipality of Barcelos
 Creixomil (Guimarães), in the municipality of Guimarães